Emmalocera lutosa is a species of snout moth in the genus Emmalocera. It was described by Anthonie Johannes Theodorus Janse in 1922. It is found in South Africa and Zimbabwe.

References

Emmalocera
Lepidoptera of South Africa
Lepidoptera of Zimbabwe
Moths of Sub-Saharan Africa
Moths described in 1922